Mompesson House is an 18th-century house located in the Cathedral Close, Salisbury, Wiltshire, England. The house is Grade I listed. and has been in the ownership of the National Trust since 1975.

History
The building was constructed for Sir Thomas Mompesson, MP for the constituency of Salisbury in 1679, 1695 and 1701. The site was purchased at the end of the 17th century and the house reflects the classic Queen Anne style of that period with Chilmark stone facing. To the right of the main house stands the brick-built service building which was constructed on the site of the old Eagle Inn that closed in 1625. Thomas's son Charles completed the building in 1701; his initials and date can be seen on the heads of the water downpipes.

After Charles' death in 1714, his brother-in-law Charles Longueville moved into the house with his widowed sister, Elizabeth. Charles added the plasterwork, staircase and the brick wing. From them the house passed via Charles' natural son, John Clark, to Mrs Hayter. Next the house was occupied by the Portman sisters, the last of whom died at a great age in 1846. The Townsend family occupied the house from 1846 to 1939, and the flamboyant artist Miss Barbara Townsend, mentioned in Edith Olivier's book Four Victorian Ladies of Wiltshire, lived there for the whole of her 96 years. The Bishop of Salisbury, Neville Lovett, lived there from 1942 to 1946.

In 1952 the freehold was purchased from the Church Commissioners by the architect, Denis Martineau, who bequeathed it to the National Trust on his death in 1975, a condition of the sale.

The overthrow, iron railings, gates and iron lamps at the front of the building are Grade I listed separately from the house.

Collections 
The house is used to display the Turnbull collection of English 18th-century drinking glasses bequeathed to the Trust in 1970. It also houses the Bessemer-Wright collection of ceramics, bequeathed by Mrs Adam Smith.

In popular culture
Mompesson House was used as a location for the 1995 film adaptation of Sense and Sensibility.

References

External links

Mompesson House information at the National Trust

Country houses in Wiltshire
Grade I listed buildings in Wiltshire
Grade I listed houses
Historic house museums in Wiltshire
Museums in Salisbury
National Trust properties in Wiltshire